Daphnusa ocellaris, the durian hawkmoth, is a species of moth of the family Sphingidae.

Distribution 
It is found in Sri Lanka, northern India, Nepal, Thailand, Yunnan in southern China, Malaysia (Peninsular, Sarawak), Indonesia (Sumatra, Java, Kalimantan) and the Philippines. Daphnusa fruhstorferi from Java is sometimes treated as a valid species.

Description 
The wingspan is 80–112 mm.

Biology 
The larvae feed on Durio and Nephelium species.

References

External links

Smerinthini
Moths described in 1856